Galilea Montijo (born Martha Galilea Montijo Torres on June 5, 1973) is a Mexican actress, comedian, model, and TV presenter. She currently hosts Hoy, a morning show of Televisa that airs on Mondays through Fridays in Mexico (on Las Estrellas) and in the United States (on Univision). Montijo hosted the talent-reality show Pequeños Gigantes, which was a success in Mexico and in the United States (again shown by Univision) in its 1st and 2nd editions (2011 and 2012 respectively). In 2014, she hosted "Va Por Ti" - a co-production of Univision and Televisa that first aired on Univision, beating the competition in the ratings. In 2015, she hosts "Me Pongo De Pie" which will air in Mexico and the United States.

Career 
Montijo started her career after winning La Chica TV in 1993. She has participated in several telenovelas.  From 2001 to 2005, Galilea hosted the show VidaTV. In 2002, she participated in the reality show Big Brother VIP and won. In 2005, she also participated in the second season of Bailando por un Sueño. In 2006, Montijo starred in the Mexican telenovela La Verdad Oculta, opposite Gabriel Soto.

Personal life
In November 2020 she announced that she had tested positive for COVID-19 and had to cancel a number of professional engagements.

Filmography

Telenovelas 
 Hasta que el dinero nos separe (2010) as herself (special episode)
 La Verdad Oculta (2006) as Gabriela Guillén de Genovés / Martha Saldívar de Guzmán
 El precio de tu amor (2000) as Valeria Ríos
 Tres mujeres (1999) as Maricruz Ruiz
 Tú y yo (1996) as Resignación
 Azul (1996) as Mara
 El premio mayor (1995) as Lilí

Television programs 
 Fantástico Amor (1999)
 Vida TV (2001-2005) Host
 Big Brother VIP (2002) Contestant, winner.
 Hospital el paisa (2004)
 Bailando por un sueño (2005) Contestant, fourth place.
 La Hora de la Papa (2007) Host
 Buscando a Timbiriche, La Nueva Banda (2007) Host 
 Cuanto Quieres Perder? (2008) Host
 Hazme reír y serás millonario (2009) Contestant, third place.
 Hoy (2008–present) Host
 Pequeños Gigantes (Mexican TV series) (2011) Host
 El Gran Show de los Peques (2011) Host
 Pequenos Gigantes 2 (Mexican TV series) (2012) Host
 Lo Que Mas Quieres (Mexican TV Reality Show) (2013) Judge of Emotions
 Va Por Ti(co-production of Univision and Televisa) (2014) Host
 Me Pongo De Pie (2015) Host
 Teleton Mexico (2011–Present) Host, on Televisa El Canal De Las Estrellas
 Teleton USA (2012–Present) Host, on Univision
 Teleton Mexoamerica (2007-2008) Host, on Galavision
 Hoy (1999, 2004–2007, 2008-)

Series 
 Mujeres Asesinas (2009) as Lorena Garrido (Episode: "Las Garrido, codiciosas")
 Los simuladores (2009) as herself (two episodes)
 Los simuladores (2008) Host
 Cásate conmigo, mi amor (2013) En El Protagónico, personaje de Valeria

Films 
Perras (2011) as adult Frida
La Muerte de un Cardenal (1993)

References

External links
 Official site

1973 births
Living people
Mexican telenovela actresses
Mexican television actresses
Mexican film actresses
20th-century Mexican actresses
Mexican female models
21st-century Mexican actresses
Mexican television talk show hosts
Mexican television presenters
Mexican women comedians
Actresses from Guadalajara, Jalisco
Big Brother (franchise) winners
People from Guadalajara, Jalisco
Mexican women television presenters